Poornima Bhagyaraj (née Jayaram) is an Indian actress in Malayalam and Tamil films. She has also done a few Hindi and Telugu films. She is best known for her leading roles from 1980 to 1985. She married actor and director K. Bhagyaraj, who directed one of her Tamil film named  Darling, Darling, Darling.

Filmography

Tamil

Malayalam

Telugu

Hindi

Producer

Short Film

Television

Serials

Shows

Web series

Awards and honours

References

External links 
 

21st-century Indian actresses
Actresses from Tamil Nadu
Actresses in Malayalam cinema
Indian film actresses
Living people
Actresses in Tamil cinema
Filmfare Awards South winners
Kerala State Film Award winners
20th-century Indian actresses
1960 births
Actresses in Telugu cinema
Actresses in Hindi cinema
Actresses in Tamil television